College Romance is an Indian Hindi-language web series created by The Viral Fever and developed by Arunabh Kumar. It stars Keshav Sadhna, Apoorva Arora, Manjot Singh, Gagan Arora and Shreya Mehta. It follows three best friends Karan, Naira, and Trippy's look for love, laughs, and some lifelong memories while attending college together.

College Romance Season 1 directed by Simarpreet Singh, premiered simultaneously on the company's media streaming platform TVF Play and in YouTube, on 7 August 2018 and it received a positive response from the audience. Following the success of the first season, the makers renewed for a second season directed by Apoorv Singh Karki, that aired through Sony LIV on 29 January 2021.

The third season directed by Parijat Joshi released on Sony LIV on 16 September 2022.

Cast

Series overview

Accolades

References

External links
 

Hindi-language web series
2018 web series debuts
2022 web series endings